Barpak Sulikot is a Rural Municipality in Gorkha District in the Gandaki Province of northern-central Nepal. After merging of 7 village development committee, it's called Barpak Sulikot

Demographics
At the time of the 2011 Nepal census, Barpak Sulikot Rural Municipality had a population of 25,399. Of these, 63.4% spoke Nepali, 22.9% Gurung, 7.8% Ghale, 3.2% Bajjika, 1.0% Magar, 0.9% Tamang, 0.5% Newar, 0.1% Urdu and 0.2% other languages as their first language.

In terms of ethnicity/caste, 39.0% were Gurung, 10.3% Brahmu/Baramo, 9.8% Hill Brahmin, 8.3% Chhetri, 8.1% Ghale, 5.5% Kami, 5.3% Magar, 5.0% Sarki, 3.4% Tamang, 2.5% Newar, 1.4% Damai/Dholi, 0.4% Gharti/Bhujel, 0.4% Thakuri, 0.2% Sanyasi/Dasnami, 0.1% Badi, 0.1% Musalman and 0.2% others.

In terms of religion, 52.0% were Hindu, 42.0% Buddhist, 3.4% Christian, 2.4% Prakriti and 0.1% Muslim.

In terms of literacy, 60.8% could both read and write, 3.0% could read but not write and 36.1% could neither read nor write.

References

Populated places in Gorkha District
Rural municipalities of Nepal established in 2017
Rural municipalities in Gorkha District